Jack Harper (born 28 February 1996) is a professional footballer who plays as a forward for Spanish club Hércules, on loan from Getafe. Born and raised in Spain, he represented his parents' birthplace Scotland at youth international levels.

Early and personal life
Harper was born in Málaga, Andalusia, Spain, to Scottish parents. He speaks both English (with a Scottish accent) and Spanish. He grew up in Fuengirola.

His brothers Ryan and Mac were also footballers. Ryan was born in Barrhead in Scotland before the family moved to Spain in the mid-1990s.

Club career

Youth career
Harper played for Fuengirola Los Boliches between 2003 and 2009. After trialling with Sevilla and Almería, Harper signed an initial 12-month contract with Real Madrid in 2009, at the age of 13. He moved to Madrid to live at the club's training ground, and attended private school.

In December 2012, Harper signed a new five-year contract with Real Madrid. In June 2014 he signed a further contract extension with the club. At the age of 18, with two years left on his contract, he chose to leave Real Madrid after the club said they wanted to loan him out.

He signed for English club Brighton & Hove Albion in July 2015. He was injured for the first six months of his time with Brighton.

Senior career

Málaga
Harper returned to Spain with Málaga in January 2017. He spent the end of the 2016–17 season and all of 2017–18 with the Málaga B team, helping them to achieve promotion to the third tier via the playoffs in the latter campaign having lost out due to a last-minute goal in the final round the previous year.

He made his first-team debut on 18 August 2018, starting in a 2–1 away win against CD Lugo in the Segunda División. He scored his first professional goal on 3 September, netting the winner in a 1–0 away success over UD Almería.

Getafe
Harper signed a pre-contract agreement with Getafe in February 2019 and completed the move in July. On 10 August, he was loaned to second division side Alcorcón for one year.

On 5 October 2020, transfer deadline day, Harper joined FC Cartagena, newly-promoted to division two, on loan for one year. On 1 February 2021, he moved to Villarreal CF B in the third division, also on loan. On 6 July 2021, he was loaned out to the third-tier again, this time joining Racing de Santander.

On 21 July 2022, Harper moved to Hércules CF also on a one-year loan deal.

International career
Harper has elected to represent Scotland at international level, saying that "even though I live in Spain, I feel Scottish, so I want to make my family proud and play for my country." He has stated his ambition to play for Scotland at the FIFA World Cup.

He was called up by the under-15 squad in April 2010, and by the under-16s in July 2011. He made his under-17 national debut in August 2012. He made a total of six appearances for the under-17s in 2012, scoring once. He made his debut for the under-19s in August 2014, making three  appearances for them that year. He was dropped from the under-19s in March 2015.

He was selected for the Scotland under-21 squad in March 2017, but did not play.

Playing style
Harper has been compared to Robin van Persie.

Honours
Atlético Malagueño
Tercera División Group 9: 2016–17, 2017–18

See also
British migration to Spain

References

External links

1996 births
Living people
Footballers from Málaga
Scottish footballers
Spanish footballers
Spanish people of Scottish descent
Scotland youth international footballers
Real Madrid CF players
Brighton & Hove Albion F.C. players
Atlético Malagueño players
Málaga CF players
Getafe CF footballers
AD Alcorcón footballers
FC Cartagena footballers
Villarreal CF B players
Racing de Santander players
Hércules CF players
Segunda División players
Primera Federación players
Segunda División B players
Tercera División players
Association football forwards
Spanish expatriate footballers
Expatriate footballers in England
Spanish expatriate sportspeople in England
UD Fuengirola Los Boliches players